Slim's was a nightclub and music venue in San Francisco, California, which was opened by Boz Scaggs in 1988. Scaggs and his partners took over a vacant restaurant which was called the Warehouse and threw a party there on December 31, 1987, to celebrate before closing it to remodel, and the new venue opened on September 16, 1988. The club closed permanently on March 18, 2020.

History
The opening acts at Slim's on September 16, 1988 were Katie Webster, Anson Funderburgh, Delbert McClinton, and 'Presidio Slim' (a.k.a. Boz Scaggs). One of Scaggs's business partners is Frank Caufield, senior partner in the venture capital firm Kleiner, Perkins, Caufield and Byers.

The Oakland Interfaith Gospel Choir first performed their Christmas Eve concert at Slim's in 1988; since then, the choir has returned every Christmas Eve as a Bay Area tradition.

Design
Slim's has an open floorplan with the stage at one end of the main level, and the bar running along two walls. There is a balcony at the other end with seating for 30, reserved for those who purchase Dinner & Admission tickets.

The "sister nightclub" to Slim's is the Great American Music Hall, owned by the same corporation since 2002.

References

External links

Jazz clubs in the San Francisco Bay Area
Music venues in San Francisco
Nightclubs in San Francisco